The Safford Micropolitan Statistical Area (Safford μSA), as defined by the United States Census Bureau, is a micropolitan statistical area (μSA) consisting of one county in eastern Arizona, anchored by the city of Safford.

As of 2010, the United States Census Bureau estimates that the μSA had a population of 37,220.

Before 2013, Safford micropolitan statistical area also contained Greenlee County, Arizona. In 2013, the United States Office of Management and Budget removed Greenlee county from the micropolitan area's definition.

Counties
 Graham County

Communities
 Places with 5,000–9,999 inhabitants
 Safford (Principal city)
 Places with 1,000–4,999 inhabitants
 Pima
 Swift Trail Junction
 Thatcher
 Other places
 Central
 Fort Thomas
 Solomonville

Demographics
As of the census of 2000 including both Graham and Greenlee counties, there were 42,036 people, 13,233 households, and 9,883 families residing within the μSA. The racial makeup of the μSA was 68.5% White, 1.6% African American, 12.2% Native American, 0.5% Asian, <0.1% Pacific Islander, 14.7% from other races, and 2.4% from two or more races. Hispanic or Latino of any race were 30.3% of the population.

The median income for a household in the μSA was $34,526, and the median income for a family was $38,970. Males had a median income of $34,738 versus $22,036 for females. The per capita income for the μSA was $13,977.

See also
 Arizona census statistical areas

References

 
Populated places in Graham County, Arizona
Populated places in Greenlee County, Arizona
Safford, Arizona